Abdoulaye Mamani (1932–1993) was a Nigerien poet, novelist and trade unionist.

Biography
Mamani was born in 1932 in Zinder, Niger. He was a trade unionist. In 1980 he published his novel Sarraounia, based on the real-life Battle of Lougou between Azna queen Sarraounia and French Colonial Forces. To write the book, he used written archives as well as oral histories. The novel was adapted into a 1986 film (also called Sarraounia) by director Med Hondo. Mamani died in a car accident in 1993 between Zinder and Niamey.

Bibliography
1972: Poémérides
1972: Eboniques
1972: L'Anthologie de Poésie de Combat
1980: Sarraounia

References

1932 births
1993 deaths
Nigerien poets
Road incident deaths in Niger
Nigerien trade unionists
Nigerien novelists
20th-century novelists
20th-century poets
People from Zinder Region